The 2021 CONCACAF League (officially the 2021 Scotiabank CONCACAF League for sponsorship purposes) was the 5th edition of the CONCACAF League, a football club competition organized by CONCACAF, the regional governing body of North America, Central America, and the Caribbean.

Comunicaciones defeated Motagua in the final to win their first CONCACAF League title. As winners, they and the next best five teams qualified for the 2022 CONCACAF Champions League. Alajuelense were the title holders but were eliminated by Guastatoya in the Round of 16.

Qualification
A total of 22 teams participated in the CONCACAF League:
North American Zone: 1 team (from one association)
Central American Zone: 18 teams (from seven associations)
Caribbean Zone: 3 teams (from two or three associations)

Therefore, teams from either 10 or 11 out of the 41 CONCACAF member associations may participate in the CONCACAF League.

North America
The one berth for the North American Zone (NAFU) was allocated to the Canadian Soccer Association through the previous year's Canadian Premier League, where the champions, decided by the Canadian Premier League Finals contested between the top two teams of the group stage, qualified. They are the second Canadian representative included in CONCACAF competitions, besides the Canadian Championship champions which qualify for the CONCACAF Champions League.

Central America
The 18 berths for the Central American Football Union (UNCAF), which consists of seven member associations, were allocated as follows: three berths for each of Costa Rica, El Salvador, Guatemala, Honduras, Panama, two berths for Nicaragua, and one berth for Belize.

All of the leagues of Central America employ a split season with two tournaments in one season, so the following teams qualified for the CONCACAF League:
In the league of Costa Rica, both champions, and the non-champions with the best Clausura record, qualified. If there was any team which were champions of both tournaments, the non-champions with the second best Clausura record qualified.
In the leagues of El Salvador, Guatemala, Honduras, and Panama, both champions, and the runners-up with the better aggregate record (or any team which are runners-up of both tournaments), qualify. If there is any team which are finalists of both tournaments, the runners-up with the worse aggregate record qualify. If there are any two teams which are finalists of both tournaments, the semi-finalists with the best aggregate record qualify.
In the league of Nicaragua, both champions qualify. If there is any team which are champions of both tournaments, the runners-up with the better aggregate record (or any team which are runners-up of both tournaments) qualify.
In the league of Belize, the champions with the better aggregate record (or any team which are champions of both tournaments) qualify.

If teams from any Central American associations were excluded, they would be replaced by teams from other Central American associations, with the associations chosen based on results from previous CONCACAF League and CONCACAF Champions League tournaments.

Caribbean
The three berths for the Caribbean Football Union (CFU), which consists of 31 member associations, were allocated via the CONCACAF Caribbean Club Championship and CONCACAF Caribbean Club Shield, the first-tier and second-tier subcontinental Caribbean club tournaments. Since 2018, the CONCACAF Caribbean Club Championship is open to teams from professional leagues, where they can qualify as champions or runners-up of their respective association's league in the previous season, while the CONCACAF Caribbean Club Shield is open to teams from non-professional leagues, where they can qualify as champions of their respective association's league in the previous season.

Besides the champions of the CONCACAF Caribbean Club Championship which qualified for the CONCACAF Champions League, the runners-up and third-placed team of the CONCACAF Caribbean Club Championship, and the winners of a playoff between the fourth-placed team of the CONCACAF Caribbean Club Championship and the champions of the CONCACAF Caribbean Club Shield, qualified for the CONCACAF League. For the champions of the CONCACAF Caribbean Club Shield to be eligible for the playoff, they were required to comply with the minimum CONCACAF Club Licensing requirements for the CONCACAF League.

Teams
The following 22 teams (from eleven associations) qualified for the tournament.
Ten teams entered in the round of 16: two each from Costa Rica, Honduras, and Panama, and one each from El Salvador, Guatemala, Nicaragua, and the Caribbean.
Twelve teams entered in the preliminary round: two each from El Salvador, Guatemala, and the Caribbean, and one each from Canada, Costa Rica, Honduras, Panama, Nicaragua, and Belize.

Notes

Draw

The draw for the 2021 CONCACAF League was held on 16 June 2021, 20:00 EDT (UTC−4), at the CONCACAF headquarters in Miami, United States.

For the preliminary round, the draw determined each tie (numbered 1 through 6) between a team from Pot 1 and a team from Pot 2, each containing six teams. Teams from the same association could not be drawn against each other except for "wildcard" teams which replace a team from another association.

For the round of 16, the draw determined each tie (numbered 1 through 8) between a team from Pot 3 and a team from Pot 4, each containing eight teams. Teams from the same association could not be drawn against each other except for "wildcard" teams which replace a team from another association. The six preliminary round winners, whose identity is not known at the time of the draw, are in Pot 4 and can be drawn into the same tie with another team from the same association.

The seeding of teams was based on the CONCACAF Club Index. The CONCACAF Club Index, instead of ranking each team, is based on the on-field performance of the teams that have occupied the respective qualifying slots in the previous five editions of the CONCACAF League and CONCACAF Champions League. To determine the total points awarded to a slot in any single edition of the CONCACAF League or CONCACAF Champions League, CONCACAF uses the following formula:

Teams qualified for the CONCACAF League based on criteria set by their association (e.g., tournament champions, runners-up, cup champions), resulting in an assigned slot (e.g., CRC1, CRC2) for each team.

The 22 teams were distributed in the pots as follows:

Format
In the CONCACAF League, the 22 teams played a single-elimination tournament. Each tie was played on a home-and-away two-legged basis.
In the preliminary round, round of 16, quarter-finals, and semi-finals, the away goals rule was applied if the aggregate score is tied after the second leg. If still tied, the penalty shoot-out was used to determine the winner (Regulations Article 12.8).
In the final, the away goals rule was not applied, and extra time would be played if the aggregate score was tied after the second leg. If the aggregate score was still tied after extra time, the penalty shoot-out would used to determine the winner (Regulations Article 12.9).

Schedule
The schedule of the competition is as follows.

Times are Eastern Time, as listed by CONCACAF (local times are in parentheses):
Times up to 6 November 2021 (preliminary round, round of 16, and quarter-finals) are Eastern Daylight Time, i.e., UTC−4.
Times thereafter (semi-finals and final) are Eastern Standard Time, i.e., UTC−5.

Bracket

Preliminary round
In the preliminary round, the matchups were decided by draw: PR-1 through PR-6. The teams from Pot 1 in the draw host the second leg.

Summary
The first legs were played on 3–5 August, and the second legs were played on 17–19 August 2021.

|}

Matches

Comunicaciones won 4–1 on aggregate.

Marathón won 3–1 on aggregate.

Santos de Guápiles won 6–1 on aggregate.

Universitario advance on walkover.

Santa Lucía won 5–1 on aggregate.

Forge FC won 5–3 on aggregate.

Round of 16
In the round of 16, the matchups were decided by draw: R16-1 through R16-6. The teams from Pot 3 in the draw host the second leg.

On 25 September 2021, CONCACAF announced that Inter Moengotapoe and C.D. Olimpia would be disqualified from the competition due to rule breaches following the first leg of their round of 16 fixture, including an alleged payment from Inter Moengotapoe owner and player Ronnie Brunswijk to several Olimpia players.

Summary
The first legs were played on 21–23 September, and the second legs were played on 28–30 September 2021.

|}

Matches

Comunicaciones won 3–1 on aggregate.

Saprissa won 6–2 on aggregate.

3–3 on aggregate. Guastatoya won on away goals.

Inter Moengotapoe and Olimpia were disqualified from the tournament by CONCACAF due to rule breaches following the first leg match.

Forge FC won 2–0 on aggregate.

Santos won 3–0 on aggregate.

Motagua won 3–2 on aggregate.

2–2 on aggregate. Marathón won 5–4 on penalties.

Quarter-finals
In the quarter-finals, the matchups were determined as follows:
QF1: Winner R16-1 vs. Winner R16-2
QF2: Winner R16-3 vs. Winner R16-4
QF3: Winner R16-5 vs. Winner R16-6
QF4: Winner R16-7 vs. Winner R16-8
The winners of round of 16 matchups 1, 3, 5, 7 host the second leg.

Summary
The first legs were played on 20 and 21 October, and the second legs were played on 2 and 4 November 2021.

|}

Matches

5–5 on aggregate. Comunicaciones won on away goals.

Forge FC won 4–3 on aggregate.

Motagua won 4–0 on aggregate.

Semi-finals
In the semi-finals, the matchups were determined as follows:
SF1: Winner QF1 vs. Winner QF2
SF2: Winner QF3 vs. Winner QF4
The semi-finalists in each tie which had the better performance in previous rounds (excluding preliminary round) hosted the second leg.

Summary
The first legs were played from 23 to 25 November, and the second legs were played from 30 November – 2 December 2021.

|}

Matches

Comunicaciones won 3–1 on aggregate.

2–2 on aggregate. Motagua won on away goals.

Final

In the final (Winner SF1 vs. Winner SF2), the finalists which had the better performance in previous rounds (excluding preliminary round) hosted the second leg.

Summary
The first leg was played on 8 December, and the second leg was played on 14 December 2021.

|}

Matches

Comunicaciones won 6–3 on aggregate.

Top goalscorers

Qualification to CONCACAF Champions League
Starting from the round of 16, teams are ranked based on their results (excluding preliminary round). Based on the ranking, the top six teams, i.e., champions, runners-up, both losing semi-finalists, and best two losing quarter-finalists, qualify for the 2022 CONCACAF Champions League.

Awards
The following awards were given at the conclusion of the tournament:

See also
2022 CONCACAF Champions League

References

External links

CONCACAF League
2021
CONCACAF League
2022 CONCACAF Champions League
August 2021 sports events in North America
September 2021 sports events in North America
October 2021 sports events in North America
November 2021 sports events in North America
December 2021 sports events in North America